Heraclius II can refer to:

Heraklonas (626–641), Byzantine emperor briefly in 641
Heraclius II of Georgia (1720/1–1798), king of Kakheti 1744–1762, of Kartli and Kakheti 1762–1798